Singleton H. Coleman was a clergyman and state legislator in Florida. He served in the Florida House of Representatives from Marion County, Florida. He was a member of the Florida House in 1873 and 1874 during the Reconstruction era.

See also
African-American officeholders during and following the Reconstruction era

References

Members of the Florida House of Representatives
Year of birth missing